Bèye or Bèye is a Senegalese surname that may refer to
Alioune Badara Bèye (born 1945), Senegalese civil servant, novelist, playwright, poet, and publisher
Ben Diogaye Bèye (born 1947), Senegalese filmwriter, filmmaker, film producer and journalist 
Habib Beye (born 1977), French-born Senegalese football player
Lingeer Fatim Beye, a 14th-century African queen
Moustapha Beye (born 1995), Senegalese football player